The Folk of the Air is a young adult fantasy book series by Holly Black, published by Little Brown Books for Young Readers. The story follows the journey of mortal girl Jude Duarte and faerie prince Cardan Greenbriar as they navigate the world of hate, betrayal, and contempt along with feelings for each other. The series is a New York Times Best Seller.

Series
The Cruel Prince (2018) is the first book in the series. It follows Jude Duarte, a mortal girl living in Elfhame, a faerie world. Swept against her will to Elfhame, Jude must adapt to living alongside powerful creatures with a deep disdain for humans and a penchant for violent delights while also figuring out her feelings for faerie prince Cardan Greenbriar.

A Visit to the Impossible Lands (2018) is a companion short story told from the perspective of Kaye and Roiben from the Modern Tale of Faerie series as they witness the events of The Cruel Prince unfold. The story was released as a bonus exclusive for the Barnes & Noble Exclusive Edition of The Cruel Prince.

The Lost Sisters (2018) is a companion novella from the perspective of Jude's twin sister Taryn Duarte. It is available only as an audiobook and an e-book.

The Wicked King (2019) is the second book in the series. It follows Jude and her newfound power and position in the faerie world of Elfhame while Cardan is thrust on the throne. The two fall for each other amidst politics, scandals, parties and plotting.

The Queen of Nothing (2019) is the third book of the series. It follows Jude and Cardan as they face not just Madoc who is hungry for the power and position of the throne, but also the extent of their love for each other.

How the King of Elfhame Learned To Hate Stories (2020) is a companion novella that focuses on Cardan's perspective.

The Cruel Prince

Plot
Jude Duarte, Taryn Duarte, and half-sister Vivienne live in the human world until a fae called Madoc, who is Vivienne's biological father, arrives one day and kills their parents. The trio are then forced to live in Faerie for a decade with Madoc's wife, Oriana, and son, Oak.

The twins are repeatedly tormented by Prince Carden Greenbriar, youngest in line, and his friends, Nicaisia, Valerian, and Locke. Throughout the book, this torment constitutes Taryn and Jude nearly drowned by the trio, Jude drugged by magic fruit and made to strip, and Valerian commanding Jude to jump off a tower (unbeknownst of Jude's protection once Prince Dain gives her the geas). Locke and Jude ultimately have an affair.

Meanwhile, Prince Dain is to be crowned within months, and he takes in Jude as a spy, due to her human ability to lie -while faeries cannot- and employs her in the Court of Shadows with a trio consisting of The Roach, The Bomb, and The Ghost. Prince Dain gives Jude a geas that prevents her from being enchanted into obeying instructions from fae(mind magic). Jude begins a practice of mithridatism – taking small doses of poison to become immune to its effects.

Jude has dinner with Locke, wearing the dress of his deceased mother, and finds an acorn within it. Upon further discovery she learns that the acorn contains a message pertaining to an heir to the throne, who the message urges to protect. The night before the coronation, Oriana warns Jude of getting herself involved with Dain, and tells her that Locke's mother, Liorope, was a concubine to the High King Eldred but ultimately assassinated. Jude is later tormented and nearly killed by a drunk Valerian,and finally kills him.

The coronation takes place, but before Dain gets crowned it is sabotaged by Prince Balekin and Madoc, who kills him. Balekin can only be crowned by a member of the royal family, and in the ensuing scuffle multiple members of the family get killed.Leaving only Cardan of the Greenbriar line. Cardan hides, is found by Jude, and both of them evacuate the halls. Jude later places Cardan in the arrest of the Court of Shadows for 24 hours, and they both have an intimate conversation where they reveal their mutual desire for each other.

Jude learns that her relationship with Locke was a foul played by Locke, and that Locke's true fiancee is actually Taryn. She later discovers that Liorope's son not only Locke, but Oak, who was seeded by Dain and is ergo a member of the Royal Family. Madoc, who had orchestrated the coup, had planned to crown Oak in order to rule as Regent. Jude plans to have Cardan crown Oak and rule as Regent herself, and Cardan agees to it, and swears allegiance to Jude for a year and a day,only because of how badly he didn't want to be crowned.
It is revealed that Prince Dain had ordered The ghost to kill liorope and the child in it , because of a prophecy claiming Dain will never be on the throne if the child is born. 

Balekin orchestrates a banquet, and Jude and Cardan arrive. Jude fights Madoc, winning due to her practise of mithraditism,him having been poisoned and fatigued. A bomb (released by The Bomb) explodes in the hall, causing chaos. In the midst of it the crown is tossed to Cardan, who is crowned by Oak unaware of Jude's actual motive, which consists of it being Cardan who gets to rule the throne. Cardan is enraged. In the epilogue, Cardan tells Jude that he shall be her puppet king, but he would be deliberately difficult for Jude to handle.

The Wicked King

Plot

Five months have elapsed since the events of The Cruel Prince – Cardan is king and five months into his one year plus one day submission to Jude. No one knows that Jude, acting as his seneschal, has control over him. Their hatred towards each other continues with Cardan angry that Jude betrayed him and made him king and Jude angry at Cardan for his continued awful behavior. Jude hopes she can extend her power over Cardan beyond the next seven months until her brother, Oak, is old enough to rule. Oak is being kept safe in the mortal world by Vivi to have a semblance of a normal childhood before he returns to rule.

Someone from the Court of Shadows tells Jude that they have intercepted a note from Balekin asking Cardan to visit him in prison. Jude goes to visit Balekin instead, but he does not tell her anything about his plans. Jude learns from a prison guard named Vulciber that messages are being exchanged by Balekin and Orlagh, queen of the Undersea, to undermine Cardan's rule. Jude is surprised since Orlagh's daughter, Nicasia, is one of Cardan's friends. While at the prison, Jude encounters Cardan's mother, Asha.

Jude's twin sister, Taryn, calls on her to make amends asks Jude to attend her wedding to Locke. Later, the Ghost brings Jude to Cardan's room, which has been largely destroyed – Cardan, Locke, and two other faeries lie drunk and half undressed. Cardan, partially wounded, shows her that two arrows were shot at him while he was in bed. He did not see who tried to assassinate him, but they find a secret passageway. Jude enters and finds Nicasia, who admits that she was furious to see Cardan in bed with another girl. She aimed to kill the girl and accidentally wounded Cardan instead. Jude asks Nicasia what Orlagh's intentions are with Balekin and Cardan. Orlagh wants Nicasia to marry Cardan and rule as queen.

Jude brings Cardan to her rooms, the only place she is confident he will be safe. He asks her to kiss him. She hates that she wants to. Jude goes to the council meeting in Cardan's place. She tries to convince the council that Orlagh is planning to move against their kingdom. Madoc pulls Jude aside after the meeting and says he still cares about her despite the fact that she poisoned him.

During a party, Nicasia catches Jude staring at Cardan. Nicasia still wants Cardan and wants to know what Jude has over him. Jude sees Cardan with a familiar ring on his finger and realizes he stole it from her hand. He tells Jude he made sure Taryn is not here for the spectacle Locke created for tonight and advises Jude to leave. Locke, who Cardan made to be is Master of Revels, begins a game, Queen of Mirth, in which a mortal girl is ensorcelled to think that she is being honored as the new queen but is instead grievously humiliated. Locke selects Jude to be ensorcelled since she is the only mortal girl at the ball. Though Jude has a gaes to protect against this, she endures the humiliation to avoid revealing her power.

After the game ends, Undersea creatures sent by Orlagh announce a message to the crowd: Orlagh wants her daughter to marry Cardan and there will be punishment if he disobeys. Cardan welcomes the creatures to stay at the revel then calls Jude to pull his council together. Before the council gathers, Madoc calls Jude and asks her to work towards a mutual goal. He wants her to ensure that Cardan does not marry Nicasia fearing that the Undersea queen slowly conquered all the kingdoms until she is the ultimate ruler. Madoc wants to use Oak as bait to draw Orlagh out, which Jude forbids.

Jude and Cardan meet with Nicasia. Cardan tells Nicasia to tell her mother that the next time she threatens him, her daughter will become his prisoner. He asks her whether she would want to be bound to him forever in an unhappy union, and Nicasia says there is more to ruling than happiness, and she thinks her mother's idea is a good one.

Cardan summons Jude and pulls her into a small room. He shows her a message Balekin sent him asking to meet. Cardan is concerned that Jude is hiding things from him, and she admits to intercepting messages from Balekin. Jude asks Cardan to seduce Nicasia to get information from her. Cardan dislikes this idea and instead practices his wiles on Jude. Jude is effectively seduced by Cardan. As they kiss, Jude thinks about how, out of all the mean things he has done to her over the years, making her like him more is the worst one.

Jude visits Grimsen to buy a gift for Taryn's wedding. Grimsen tells her he knows of her mortal father's metalworking and suggests that he once taught him. He offers Jude a pair of earrings to give Taryn in exchange for one of Jude's tears. The earrings are enchanted to magnify the wearer's beauty. Grimsen asks Jude to take a message to the king: if they go to war, he will fashion armor that cannot be penetrated and swords so strong Cardan will easily win.

Jude goes to the Court of Shadows to work on her safety plans for Oak. Cardan arrives to bring her news of what he discovered from Nicasia after a few kisses. Her mother plans to act during Taryn's wedding. Before he leaves, he mentions the intimacy that happened between them the other night. Jude cuts him off and says she is sure it served the same purpose for both of them: to get it out of their system.

Jude goes to Madoc with information about Orlagh's plan to attack during the wedding, and they work together to ensure Oak's safety. The night before the wedding, Taryn asks Jude and Vivi to spend the night. On her way to Madoc's house, Jude is attacked by men on horseback. She is injured though fights back and escapes. In the process, she loses the earrings she bought for Taryn.

At the wedding, Jude sees Cardan finding a look of hatred in his eyes similar to the last time she was here at Locke's house when he was watching her and Locke kiss. He merely compliments her dress. Jude is worried that she is falling in love with him. Jude orders Cardan to never be alone tonight even though the implications of the statement bother her. Madoc heard their exchange and now knows about Jude's control over Cardan. He says they will work together to defeat Orlagh, but after that, they will be enemies.

Taryn arrives at her wedding party wearing the earrings that Jude intended to give her that she lost when she was attacked. Jude notices Locke's limp, and she realizes that it was he and his friends who attacked her.

Jude learns that Orlagh has made an attack on the prison, and she leaves the wedding to investigate. Jude goes to Asha's cell to set her free before going to Balekin's cell, finding it empty. Orlagh has rescued him in hopes of marrying her daughter to him and making him king someday. The Ghost joins Orlagh's forces revealing to Jude that he has betrayed her.

Jude is held captive in a cell in the Undersea where Nicasia comes to assault and berate her. Jude is brought to eat dinner with Orlagh, and since she is not wearing any charms, Orlagh believes Jude can be ensorcelled to do whatever they command. Even though Jude is protected by Dain's gaes, she acts like she is under their spell. Jude is questioned by Orlagh though is also able to learn some of their schemes. She learns that Grimsen is making a new crown to make Balekin king.

After countless days in prison, Jude learns that Cardan has offered to pay a ransom to get Jude back. Balekin glamours Jude to make her loyal to them and commands her to kill Cardan, giving her poison to do so. Upon returning to land, Jude learns that in exchange for her freedom, Cardan has made concessions, including allowing Balekin to be free and live as the ambassador to Elfhame from the Undersea.

Jude is taken to Madoc's house despite her request to return to the palace. There, Taryn tells Jude she has been gone about a month and that Cardan and their father formed a truce to try to get her back. Jude is called on by Dulcamara from the Court of Termites. Dulcamara tells Jude that Cardan gave the Undersea permission to attack her court and many of her people died. Jude learns that this was part of the price of her ransom. Dulcamara says they pledged to King Cardan because he was supposed to protect them. She reminds Jude that she still owes their court a favor, and she asks for Jude to kill Prince Balekin. Jude says if she kills him, then they will be at war with the Undersea, which Dulcamara accepts.

Jude goes to the palace to reach Cardan, but the guards have been ordered by Madoc not to let her in. Jude decided to go to Hallow Hall to reach Balekin, as he would expect her to do, and he gives her poison to kill Cardan. Jude returns to the palace and sneaks into Cardan's room. When she wakes him, he pulls her into bed with him. She tells him that Orlagh and Balekin are planning his murder. Cardan confesses to Jude why he betrayed others to get her back. He says that it took her being kidnapped to figure out his true feelings for her. The Roach and the Bomb appear and tell Cardan that Jude is working under orders from Balekin to kill him. They search Jude and find the poison that Balekin gave her. She explains that Balekin thought he had ensorcelled her to kill Cardan, but that she is immune to such spells because of the gaes she received from Dain.

At a masquerade ball, Jude tells Locke she knows he tried to kill her before his wedding, and she plans to retaliate. Lord Roiben from the Court of Termites arrives and says he expects Jude to make good on her promise. Jude sees Asha at the ball and wonders whether Cardan reconciled with his mother. Cardan arrives at the ball appearing to be extremely drunk and making a fool of himself. He pulls Jude onto the dance floor and kisses her very publicly, at which point Jude tastes wraithberry on his lips and recognizes that Cardan has been poisoned. Jude escorts him away and finds the Bomb to work to cure him. Balekin sends a note that he has the antidote and that he will give it to Cardan in exchange for the crown. Jude duels against Balekin for the antidote and ultimately kills Balekin. When Jude returns to Cardan, she discovers Madoc had Taryn pose as Jude to fool Cardan into giving Madoc half of the army. Cardan agreed because he trusts Jude.

Later that night, Cardan calls Jude back to his room and asks her to give him his free will back. He asks her to marry him, which will allow her to give him any royal orders she wants and bypass her needing to order him around to get things done. He suggests they only need to stay married until Oak is ready to rule. They perform the ceremony themselves with Cardan returning to Jude the ring he had previously given her. Jude follows through and releases him from his service to her.

The next morning, Cardan learns that his brother was killed by Jude in a duel. Orlagh arrives to have Cardan account for why her Ambassador was killed. Cardan accepts no blame because it was not his wish for his brother to die. Orlagh knows it was Jude and demands justice. She threatens war, and he threatens to use his powers over nature that being the High King of Elfhame grants him. He can control the land under all of the water, and to prove this, he creates a new island to emerge from the water. As he does this, Cardan traps Nicasia in a tree, and Orlagh relents in exchange for Cardan releasing her daughter. Cardan requests Nicasia stay behind on the land to serve as an ambassador. To further appease Orlagh and maintain peace with the Undersea, Cardan exiles Jude to the mortal world. She protests that he cannot do this because she is the Queen of Elfhame, but she is laughed at and dismissed. Ultimately, Jude goes to live with Vivi and Oak in the mortal world.

The Queen of Nothing

Plot
The Prologue recounts the birth of Cardan Greenbriar, and a prophecy made at his birth that he will be the last of Eldred's offspring and will be the destruction of the crown and the ruination of the throne. The Royal Astrologer who makes this prediction also says that out of the boy's spilled blood can a great ruler rise, but only after the aforementioned prophecy comes to pass. As a result of this prophecy, Cardan is poorly treated and raised in squalor despite the fact that he is a Prince of Faerie.

Returning to the present-day story, Jude is living in the human world with Vivi and Oak. Not having any human documents to get a real job, she works odd jobs for a creature of Faerie known as Bryern in exchange for money to pay rent. He tells her that Grima Mog, former general to the Court of Teeth, has been exiled to the human world, and she has been eating the local Folk that live in the mortal world. Bryern gives her money in exchange for getting Grima Mog to stop her practice in this. Jude does so by fighting Grima Mog and making her promise to stop eating the Folk.

Jude returns home to find that Taryn has come from the Faerie realm. Taryn tells Jude that she is pregnant, her husband Locke had been abusive towards her, and she ultimately ended up killing him. She says that there is going to be an inquest into Locke's murder, and Taryn asks Jude to return to Faerie, pretending to be Taryn, so that she will be able to lie that she did not murder Locke, and thus will not be punished for Locke's death. Jude agrees to this even though it puts Jude at risk since Cardan had banished Jude from Faerie under penalty of death until or unless she is pardoned by the crown. Jude returns to meet with Cardan and the court pretending to be Taryn, but after the inquest has concluded, Cardan takes her aside and tells her that he knows that she is Jude and not Taryn. He asks why Jude has not responded to any of his letters, and Jude replies that she never received any letters from him. An attack is made in the palace, and Jude is kidnapped by Madoc's army, believing that they are rescuing Taryn from Cardan.

Jude, while continuing to be believed to be Taryn, is taken under Madoc's protection. He has taken half of Cardan's army and conspired with the Court of Teeth to take over Cardan's reign of Faerie. He has employed Grimsen to forge a new sword for him that will effectively overrule the power of the Blood Crown that Cardan wears. While in the camp of the Court of Teeth, Oriana discovers Jude and agrees to  send a message to her sisters to help Jude escape the camp. While awaiting her escape, she finds the Ghost chained up, prisoner to Madoc. She learns that Locke knew the Ghost's true name and that Locke gave Madoc this information as part of the dowry for his marriage to Taryn. This is the reason why the Ghost was compelled to kidnap Jude and bring her to the undersea.

The Roach and Cardan come to the camp to help Jude escape, though she tells Cardan to leave since it is too dangerous for him to be here. She tells them that she already has a plan to escape with her sisters. In her escape, she is caught by Madoc, with whom she duels. Madoc gives her a deathly wound and expects that Jude will die from this. Jude asks for dirt to be packed into her wound, which saves her since she is the ruler of the land, and the land has the power to cure her.

Jude returns to the palace as they make preparations against the expected assault from Madoc's army. Jude has chosen Grima Mog as Grand General against the assault. Madoc and his army come to the palace with Madoc bringing the weapon that Grimsen has forged for him – a sword that can harness the power of the earth, rivaling the power that lies in the Blood Crown that Grimsen had previously forged. Madoc challenges Cardan to a duel in order to determine who will rule Faerie. He offers the sword to Cardan and thrusts the sword into the ground, which causes the ground to crack and split the throne causing the ruination of the throne. Madoc questions if Cardan has the loyalty of the people. Cardan recounts the prophecy that was made at his birth that he would be the destruction of the crown and the ruination of the throne. He says that he believes the people should choose of their own free will to follow a ruler and not be bound to a crown. He breaks the crown in half not knowing that when Grimsen forged the crown, he cursed it, which transforms Cardan into a snake. Grimsen tells that as a snake, he will poison the land, and that true love's kiss cannot stop it, only death. Cardan, in snake form, then kills Grimsen before burrowing into the ground.

Jude, acting as Queen, tries to formulate how to maintain her rule against Madoc's threat and solve Cardan's curse. Madoc and the Court of Teeth offer Jude the gift of a golden bridle that would be able to control Cardan. She later learns that they gave her incorrect instructions on how to use it, which would have tied her to the snake and left Madoc in control. A plan is made for Jude to capture the snake, but instead of putting the bridle on him, she cuts the snake's head off. The second part of the prophecy – only out of his spilled blood can a great ruler rise – is fulfilled when Cardan, in his original form, emerges from the pool of the snake's blood.  In the Epilogue, Cardan and Jude are crowned and they banish Madoc to live in the human world.

How the King of Elfhame Learned to Hate Stories
The book is a collection of short stories organized into nine chapters, which are richly illustrated. The chapters include stories from Cardan's early childhood, occurring before the main trilogy; stories occurring within the timespan of the trilogy, told from Cardan's point of view; and stories occurring after the events of The Queen of Nothing.

Characters
 Jude Duarte: High Queen of Elfhame; Eva and Justin's daughter; Taryn's twin sister; Vivi's half-sister; Madoc's foster daughter; Oak's adopted sister; Cardan's wife

 Cardan Greenbriar: High King of Elfhame; Asha and Eldred's son; Balekin, Kaeliq, Elowyn, Dain, Rhyia and Caelia's half-brother; Jude's husband

 Madoc: Former Grand General of Elfhame; Eva's former husband; Vivi's father; Jude, Taryn and Oak's adoptive father; Oriana's husband

 Taryn Duarte: Eva and Justin's daughter; Jude's twin sister; Vivi's half-sister; Madoc's foster daughter; Oak's adoptive sister; Locke's former wife

 Vivienne "Vivi" Duarte: Eva and Madoc's daughter; Justin's adopted daughter; Jude and Taryn's half-sister; Oak's adoptive sister; Heather's girlfriend

 Oriana: Eldred's former lover; Liriope's friend; Madoc's wife; Oak's foster mother

 Oak Greenbriar: Liriope and Dain's son; Oriana and Madoc's adopted son; Jude, Taryn and Vivi's adopted brother

 Locke: Elfhame's former Master of Revels; Liriope's son; Cardan and Valerian's former friend; Nicasia's former fling; Taryn's former husband; killed by Taryn

 Nicasia: Princess of the Undersea; Orlagh's daughter; Cardan's former girlfriend; Locke's former fling

 Balekin Greenbriar: Former ambassador of the Undersea; Eldred's eldest son; Elowyn, Dain, Rhyia, Caelia and Cardan's half-brother; killed by Jude

 Orlagh: Queen of the Undersea; Nicasia's mother

 Van, "The Roach": Member of the Court of Shadows; Dain's former spy and theft expert; Liliver's lover

 Liliver, "The Bomb": Member of the Court of Shadows; Dain's former spy and explosives expert; Van's lover

 Garrett, "The Ghost": Member of the Court of Shadows; Dain's former spy and shooting expert; Taryn's lover

 Heather: Vivi's mortal girlfriend

 Grima Mog: Former general of the Court of Teeth; Grand General of Elfhame

 Dain Greenbriar: Taniot and Eldred's son; Balekin, Elowyn, Rhyia, Caelia and Cardan's half-brother; Oak's biological father; killed by Madoc

 Lady Asha: Cardan's mother

 Valerian: Cardan, Locke and Nicasia's former friend; killed by Jude

 Eva Duarte: Former wife of Madoc; Wife of Justin; Mother to Jude, Taryn and Vivi; Killed by Madoc

 Justin Duarte: Former master sword-smith; Husband of Eva; Father to Jude and Taryn; Killed by Madoc

 Dulmacara: Knight for Court of Termites; Guard to Lord Roiben

 Lord Roiben: Lord of Court of Termites; Lover to Kaye

 Kaye: Favourite consort of Roiben; Alllied to Court of Termites

 Val Moren: Seneschal and lover to former king Eldred; Court Poet

 Grimsen: Court Blacksmith; back to Faerie after being exiled by king Eldred

 Eldred Greenbriar: Former high king; Father to Balekin, Elowyn, Dain, Rhiya, Caelia and Cardan; Killed by Balekin

 Elowyn Greenbriar: Daughter of Eldred; Sister to Balekin, Dain, Rhyia, Caelia and half-sister to Cardan; Killed by Balekin

 Rhiya Greenbriar; Daughter of Eldred; Sister to Baslekin, Dain, Elowyn, Caelia and half-sister to Cardan; Good friend of Vivi; Killed herself

 Caelia Greenbriar: Daughter of Eldred; Sister to Balekin, Dain, Elowyn, Rhiya and half-sister to Cardan; Killed by the Ghost

 Sophie: Former human servant to Balekin; Rescued by Jude; Killed herself; Adopted by merfolk of the Undersea

Development
The series features appearances by characters from Black's previous Modern Tale of Faerie trilogy, as well as characters from her standalone novel The Darkest Part of the Forest, establishing that those books take place in the same universe as The Folk of the Air series. Holly Black has also set her most recent book, ‘The Stolen Heir,’ in Elfhame. This book is the first in a duology and will be followed by ‘The Prisoner’s Throne’ which has yet to be published.

Special Editions
The Folk of the Air series has been reprinted into special editions by multiple companies including, illumicate, Fairyloot, and Barnes and Noble. In 2022 Litjoy also announced the complete special editions of The Folk of Air series.

Film adaptation
In June 2017, it was announced that The Cruel Prince had been optioned for a film adaptation produced by Universal Pictures and Michael De Luca.

References

Works by Holly Black
Book series introduced in 2018
Fantasy novel series
Novels set in fictional countries
Little, Brown and Company books
Novels about fairies and sprites